Pathiramanal is a small island in Muhamma panchayat of Alappuzha district located in Vembanad Lake. The name Pathiramanal means 'midnight sand'. The scenic beauty of both sides of the lake as well as that of the island is mind blowing. It is home to many rare varieties of migratory birds from different parts of the world.

Geography
The Pathiramanal Island is 28.505 ha. It is about 1.5 km from Muhamma boat jetty and about 13 km from Alapuzha. From the jetty close by Baker Bungalow the distance to the island is about 5 km and from Kumarakom 4 km towards northwest.

Maximum length: 550m (SW to NE)
Maximum width: 450m (SE to NW)
Perimeter: 1800 m
Estimated Area: 19.6 ha  
Distance to the nearest main land: 810m

History

The island (also known as Anantha Padmanabhan Thoppu) was purchased by Chevalier ACM Anthraper, from M/s Bheemji Devji Trust of Cochin and was under the private ownership of Thaimattathil Family until the late seventies. When Land Reforms Acts were enforced in the State in 1979, the island came under government ownership. The island was returned to the government as a surplus land that crossed the land ceiling. It was later transferred to the Tourism Department and the idea of leasing it out to private enterprises was under consideration. The island at present is uninhabited. Till late seventies of the 20th century 14 worker families resided in the island, who were later rehabilitated on the mainland in the Muhamma panchayath.

Getting There

The island is an hour and half drive by motor boat or 30 minutes by speed boat from Alappuzha town. One can also take the boats plying in the Muhamma-Kumarakom water route. The SWTD boats plying in the Muhamma-Kumarakom water route no longer stops at Pathiramanal.  It takes around 40 minutes from Kumarakom to reach Pathiramanal. The journey through Vembanad Lake is a marvellous experience.
The best way to reach Pathiramanal is by renting a boat from Kayippuram jetty, which is just about 1 km east of the Kayippuram junction on the Alappuzha - Thannirmukkam road.

Nearest railway station : Alappuzha

Nearest airports : Cochin International Airport, about 85 km north of Alappuzha and Thiruvananthapuram International Airport, about 150 km towards the south.

Birdwatching

The island is a birdwatcher's paradise. It is home to around 91 local species of birds and 50 migratory birds. One can see pintail ducks, common teal, night heron, cormorant, darter, Indian shag, purple heron, gulls, terns, large egrets, intermediate egret, cattle egret, Indian pond heron, little egret, pheasant-tailed and bronze-winged jacanas, stork-billed kingfisher, watercock, whistling duck, cotton pygmy-goose, little cormorant and whiskered tern. Some people have even reported seeing the monarch flycatcher.

See also

Kakkathuruth

References

External links

 Pathiramanal Guide
 www.pathiramanal.com
 About Pathiramanal

Islands of Kerala
Lake islands of India
Bird sanctuaries of Kerala
Geography of Alappuzha district
Populated places in India
Islands of India